The 35th Fighter Squadron is a United States Air Force unit, assigned to the 8th Operations Group, stationed at Kunsan Air Base, South Korea. The squadron operates the General Dynamics F-16 Fighting Falcon aircraft conducting air superiority missions.

The 35th FS is one of two squadrons of Block 40 F-16C/Ds at Kunsan, flying the Fighting Falcon since 1981. The 35th is one of the oldest squadrons in the United States Air Force, its history dating to 12 June 1917, when the unit was activated as the 35th Aero Squadron.

History

World War I
The 35th Fighter Squadron heritage dates back to 12 June 1917, when the unit activated as the 35th Aero Squadron.  The squadron arrived in France in September 1917. After a first stop at the Etampes on 20 September, it spent some time in Paris then settled on Issoudun Aerodrome where it helped building the new Third Aviation Instruction Center, before being declared operational in November 1917, as the 35th Aero Squadron (Repair).

After being relieved some time between December 1918 and January 1919, it stopped at Clisson, France on 4 January 1919, before boarding in Saint-Nazaire harbor on 20 February a ship which took it back to United States.

Inter-war years
"Recognizing the need for a strong air arm, American defense officials reconstituted the squadron in June 1932 and redesignated it the 35th Pursuit Squadron.  For the next few years, the 35th flew Boeing P-12, Consolidated P-30, Northrop A-17 Nomad, and Curtiss P-36 Hawk aircraft out of Langley Field, Virginia. In 1939, the unit was redesignated the 35th Pursuit Squadron (Fighter) and moved to Mitchel Field, New York, to fly the P-40 Warhawk."

World War II
The squadron has never been stationed in the United States since. It arrived in Brisbane, Queensland on 6 March 1942. After arrival, it moved to Amberley Airfield, west of Brisbane, where it was equipped with Bell P-39D Airacobras that were originally intended to go to the Philippines but the convoy carrying them was diverted to Brisbane.

They then moved to Woodstock Airport, Queensland outside of Townsville in northern Queensland on 26 April 1942 on their way to Port Moresby, New Guinea where they arrived on 30 April 1942. There, the squadron operated from a gravel fighter strip constructed by the Australians in the 1930s called Kila Kila Airfield (3 Mile Drome).  After two months in combat, the squadron rotated back to Australia, returning to Woodstock on 29 June 1942 for various rest and re-equipment tasks. They relocated to Garbutt Field in Townsville on 27 July 1942 and then moved to Milne Bay in New Guinea on 18 September 1942 after the airfield was secured from the Japanese. It again engaged in combat operations against Japanese forces with its P-39s until rotated back to Queensland, being sent to Mareeba Airfield in February 1943 as its Airacobras were basically worn-out. At Mareeba, the squadron was re-equipped with Curtiss P-40N Warhawks before leaving Australia for good in May and heading back to Port Moresby.

In New Guinea, the squadron covered landings and supported offensive ground operations in New Britain, New Guinea, and Hollandia, with the group moving forward to different bases as territory was captured from the Japanese. At Cape Gloucester, the P-40s were replaced by Lockheed P-38F Lightnings that were ferried up from Australia. It was with the P-38 that the 8th Fighter Group became truly effective both against the Japanese Zero in air-to-air battles, as well as providing ground support to MacArthur's ground forces. Its twin engines offered an additional safety factory when operating over long stretches of water and jungle. The Lightnings proved to be extremely rugged and could take a lot of battle damage and still keep flying. Missions lasting 9, 10, or even 12 hours became routine, and many wounded Lightnings were able to limp home on only one engine.

In 1944, the 35th supported operations in the Philippines, earning a second Distinguished Unit Citation when, armed only with machine guns, the Lightnings of the 8th Fighter Group strafed a Japanese naval task force for three hours, halting the ships until North American B-25 Mitchell medium bombers from more distant bases could attack the task force with low-level bomb runs Despite the fact that the group did not have time to load bombs on its fighters and used only .50 caliber bullets on the mission, the 8th managed to sink one of the Japanese ships.

After moving to San Jose, Occidental Mindoro in the Philippines in December 1944, the 35th spent the next several months conducting offensive operations against Formosa and the Asian mainland, as well as flying escort missions in the area. Moving to Ie Shima Airfield in August 1945, the 8th flew several missions against the Japanese island of Kyushu before the war ended.

On 14 August 1945, the day of the Japanese surrender, the 35th Fighter Squadron shot down the last enemy plane of the war. During its involvement in World War II, the 35th participated in nine campaigns.

Korean War

"When the Korean War began, the redesignated 35th Fighter-Bomber Squadron entered combat.  Once on the offensive, the 35th moved from base to base in Korea, flying the Lockheed F-80 Shooting Star and later the North American F-86 Sabre.  At one time, the 35th was stationed at Pyongyang, now the capital of North Korea."

Pacific Air Forces service
When the Korean War ended, the squadron started flying North American F-100 Super Sabres at its new location at Itazuke Air Base, Japan.  In 1963, the squadron received Republic F-105 Thunderchiefs to replace the F-100s and moved to Yokota Air Base, Japan.

In 1964, the 35th deployed to Korat Royal Thai Air Force Base, Thailand, as one of the first units to fight in Southeast Asia. It later moved to Takhli Royal Thai Air Force Base, Thailand. The squadron also performed numerous deployments to Osan Air Base, Korea.

On 15 March 1972, the 35th moved to Kunsan Air Base to fly the McDonnell F-4 Phantom II. In September 1981, the 35th and its sister squadron, the 80th Tactical Fighter Squadron, became the first overseas units to convert to the General Dynamics F-16 Fighting Falcon. The squadrons and wing dropped the 'tactical' designation from their titles during an Air Force-wide reorganization on 31 January 1992.

On 17 November 2000, the 35th Fighter Squadron received its first Block 40 F-16s. The new aircraft carry Low-Altitude Navigation and Targeting Infrared for Night, or LANTIRN, pods. The 35th completed the conversion in February 2001.

Lineage

 Organized as the 35th Aero Squadron on 12 June 1917
 Demobilized on 19 March 1919
 Reconstituted and redesignated 35th Pursuit Squadron on 24 March 1923
 Activated on 25 June 1932
 Redesignated 35th Pursuit Squadron (Fighter) on 6 December 1939
 Redesignated 35th Pursuit Squadron (Interceptor) on 12 March 1941
 Redesignated 35th Fighter Squadron on 15 May 1942
 Redesignated 35th Fighter Squadron, Two Engine on 19 February 1944
 Redesignated 35th Fighter Squadron, Single Engine on 8 January 1946
 Redesignated 35th Fighter Squadron, Jet on 1 January 1950
 Redesignated 35th Fighter-Bomber Squadron on 20 January 1950
 Redesignated 35th Tactical Fighter Squadron on 1 July 1958
 Redesignated 35th Fighter Squadron on 3 February 1992

Assignments
 Unknown 12 June 1917
 Third Aviation Instruction Center, November 1917
 Unknown, January 1919 – 19 Mar 1919
 8th Pursuit Group (later 8th Fighter Group, 8th Fighter-Bomber Group), 25 June 1932 (attached to 8th Fighter-Bomber Wing after 1 February 1957)
 8th Fighter-Bomber Wing (later 8th Tactical Fighter) Wing, 1 October 1957 (attached to 41st Air Division, after 13 May 1964)
 41st Air Division, 18 June 1964 (attached to 2d Air Division, 24 September – 20 November 1964)
 6441st Tactical Fighter Wing, 1 April 1965 (attached to 2d Air Division, 4 May – 26 June 1965 and 19 October – 15 November 1965)
 41st Air Division, 15 November 1966
 347th Tactical Fighter Wing, 15 January 1968 (attached to Detachment 1, 347th Tactical Fighter Wing, 10 June – 16 July 1968, 22 August – 1 October 1968, 22 November – 26 December 1968, 21 March – 23 April 1969, 30 June – 6 August 1969, 17 October – 29 November 1969, 30 January – 7 March 1970, 8–30 May 1970, 11 July – 8 August 1970, 2–30 October 1970, and 26 December 1970 – 23 January 1971)
 3d Tactical Fighter Wing, 15 March 1971 (attached to 366th Tactical Fighter Wing, 3 April – 12 June 1972; 388th Tactical Fighter Wing, 12 June–c. 12 October 1972)
 8th Tactical Fighter Wing (later 8th Fighter Wing), 16 September 1974
 8th Operations Group, 3 February 1992 – present

Stations

 Camp Kelly (later Kelly Field), Texas, 12 June – 11 August 1917
 Étampes, France, 20 September 1917
 Paris, France, 23 September 1917
 Issoudun Aerodrome, France, November 1917
 Clisson, France, 4 January 1919
 Saint-Nazaire, France, 9–20 February 1919
 Garden City, New York, 9–19 March 1919
 Langley Field, Virginia, 25 June 1932
 Mitchel Field, New York, 14 November 1940 – 26 January 1942
 Brisbane, Australia, 6 March 1942
 Port Moresby, New Guinea, 26 April 1942
 Woodstock Airport, Australia, 29 June 1942
 Townsville, Australia, 27 July 1942
 Milne Bay, New Guinea, 18 September 1942
 Mareeba Airfield, Australia, 24 February 1943
 Port Moresby, New Guinea, 10 May 1943
 Finschhafen Airport, New Guinea, 25 December 1943
 Cape Gloucester, New Britain, 19 February 1944
 Nadzab Airfield Complex, New Guinea, 14 March 1944
 Owi, Schouten Islands, 1 July 1944
 Morotai, Netherlands East Indies, 4 October 1944
 Dulag Airfield, Leyte, Philippines, 5 November 1944 (operated from Morotai until 28 November 1944)
 San Jose, Mindoro, Philippines, 20 December 1944
 Ie Shima Airfield, Ryuku Islands, 9 August 1945
 Fukuoka Airfield, Japan, c. 21 November 1945

 Ashiya Air Base, Japan, 20 May 1946
 Itazuke Air Base, Japan, 5 September 1946
 Ashiya Air Base, Japan, 15 April 1947
 Miho Air Base, Japan, 10 August 1948
 Itazuke Air Base, Japan, 16 June 1949
 Tsuiki Air Base, Japan, 11 August 1950
 Suwon Air Base, South Korea, 7 October 1950
 Kimpo Air Base, South Korea, 26 October 1950
 Pyongyang Air Base, North Korea, 25 November 1950
 Seoul Air Base, South Korea, 3 December 1950
 Itazuke Air Base, Japan, 10 December 1950
 Kimpo Air Base, South Korea, 25 June 1951
 Suwon Air Base, South Korea, 24 August 1951
 Itazuke Air Base, Japan, 20 October 1954
 Yokota Air Base, Japan, 13 May 1964 (deployed to Korat Royal Thai Air Force Base, Thailand, 24 September – 20 November 1964; Takhli Royal Thai Air Force Base, Thailand 4 May – 25 June 1965, 19 October – 15 November 1965; Osan Air Base, South Korea, 10 June – 16 July 1968, 22 August – 1 October 1968, 23 November – 26 December 1968, 21 March – 23 April 1969, 30 June – 6 August 1969, 17 October – 29 November 1969, 30 January – 7 March 1970, 8–30 May 1970, 11 July – 8 August 1970, 2–30 October 1970 and 26 December 1970 – 23 January 1971))
 Kunsan Air Base, South Korea, 15 March 1971 – present (deployed to Da Nang Air Base, South Vietnam, 3 April – 12 June 1972; Korat Royal Thai Air Force Base, Thailand 13 June-c. 12 October 1972)

Aircraft

 Boeing P-12 (1932–1936)
 Curtiss P-6 Hawk (1933–1936)
 Consolidated P-30 (1936–1939)
 Curtiss YP-37 (1938–1940)
 Northrop A-17 Nomad (1938–1940)
 Curtiss P-40 Warhawk (1940–1941, 1943–1944)
 Bell P-39 Airacobra (1941–1943)
 Bell P-400 Airacobra I (1942–1943)

 Lockheed P-38 Lightning (1944–1946)
 North American P-51 Mustang (1946–1950)
 Lockheed F-80 Shooting Star (1949–1953)
 North American F-86 Sabre (1953–1957)
 North American F-100 Super Sabre (1956–1963)
 Republic F-105 Thunderchief (1963–1967)
 McDonnell F-4 Phantom II (1964–1981)
 General Dynamics F-16 Fighting Falcon (1981 – present)

See also

 List of American aero squadrons

References

Notes
 Explanatory notes

 Citations

Bibliography

External links
 35th Fighter Squadron Fact Sheet

035
035